Sharkboy are an alternative rock band from Brighton, England, formed in the early 1990s by Avy, the lead singer, songwriter and guitarist. They released two albums in the mid-1990s and the current outfit consists of 3 of the original members: Avy, Adrian Oxaal and Dil Davies.

History
The band was formed in the early 1990s by the Preston-born Avy (vocals, guitar), recruiting American-born Oxaal (guitar, cello, keyboards) and multi-instrumentalist Gavin Cheyne on bass. The band signed to Nude Records after being championed by Brett Anderson of Suede and released their debut album Matinee in 1994, which was described by CMJ New Music Monthly as "moody aggression with bite", and by Allmusic writer Ned Raggett as "an enjoyable, moody debut". Original members included Toby Shippey (trumpet), Dil Davies (drums, percussion) Alan Stirner (guitar) and Nick Wilson (keyboards, trumpet, percussion). Four singles in 1995 preceded the band's second album, The Valentine Tapes, which included Dickon Hinchcliffe of Tindersticks on violin. The band carried on in various forms, including drummer Steve Hewitt joining the outfit following the departure of Dil Davies. They released a limited edition 500 vinyl boxed set featuring cover versions of lounge classics and a thrash feedback version of the Serge Gainsbourg penned "Je t'aime... moi non plus" which remains a rarity. Following the demobbing of original members after the second album's release, Avy, Adrian Oxaal and Jessica Fischer (bass/cello) played to appreciative audiences in New York and Los Angeles in 1997.

Oxaal went on to join James. Toby Shippey is a founder member of Salsa Celtica. Steve Hewitt joined Placebo before going on to form his own band Love Amongst Ruin. Avy re-recruited Oxaal and Dil Davies, the band's original drummer in 2015 and work continues on soundtracks to Avy's animated stop motion films, including the award winning 'A New Life Tomorrow' the story of her stepfathers boyhood in wartime London. A new album / multi-media release titled BirdTown is being recorded for release in 2023.

Musical style
The band has been compared to My Bloody Valentine, Mazzy Star, Drugstore, Tindersticks, and Mojave 3. On the band's second album, Allmusic identified a "blend of country, blues, post-punk textures".

Discography

Albums
Matinee (1994), Nude
The Valentine Tapes (1995), Nude
Spell (2018) Firehorse! Recordings

Singles
"Crystaline" (1993), Nude
"Razor" (1994), Nude
"Big Black Jaguar" (1995), Nude
"Little Leopard" (1995), Nude
"My Magnetic Susan" (1995), Nude
"Tiny Seismic Night" (1995), Nude

References

English alternative rock groups
Musical groups from Brighton and Hove